Louisiana Highway 2 (LA 2) is a state highway located in northern Louisiana.  It runs  in an east–west direction from the Texas state line southwest of Vivian to a junction with U.S. Highway 65 (US 65) near Lake Providence, just west of the Mississippi state line.

It is the northernmost cross-state highway in Louisiana and runs between Interstate 20 (I-20) and the Arkansas state line for its entire distance.  LA 2 spans nine parishes, connecting five parish seats with direct connections to the remaining four, traveling through Homer, Bastrop, and smaller communities such as Hosston, Plain Dealing, Sarepta, Bernice, Farmerville, Mer Rouge, and Oak Grove.  LA 2 also has intersections with many of the state's major north–south routes, such as LA 1, US 71, US 371, US 167, US 165, and at its eastern terminus, US 65.  An interchange with the newly constructed extension of I-49 was scheduled to be completed in Spring 2013 and opened to traffic later in the year.

Route description

Texas state line to Homer
From the west, LA 2 begins at the Texas state line, continuing the route of Texas State Highway 49 (SH 49) into northern Caddo Parish, Louisiana. LA 2 turns north, running concurrent with LA 1 along the Kansas City Southern Railway (KCS) tracks into Vivian. The highway widens to accommodate a center turning lane at Rebel Road. LA 2 then turns northeast onto Camp Road while LA 1 continues northward. Returning to two-lane capacity, LA 2 is now joined by LA 170 which follows LA 1 through much of Vivian. After two blocks, LA 170 turns south onto South Pardue Street while LA 2 turns north and then east out of town. After , LA 2 enters Hosston, where it intersects US 71, which heads through Ida into Arkansas on the north and to Shreveport on the south. From this junction, LA 2 turns north onto US 71 briefly before resuming its eastward course.   outside of Hosston, LA 2 crosses a bridge over the Red River and into Bossier Parish.

In Bossier Parish, LA 2 intersects LA 537 and continues east for another  into Plain Dealing.  LA 2 follows Mary Lee Street through town and intersects LA 3 (Louisiana Street), which also connects to Shreveport.  Proceeding east from this intersection, LA 2 widens to an undivided four-lane highway.  It then crosses the Union Pacific Railroad (UP) tracks and shortly thereafter intersects LA 157 (North Magnolia Street), which takes a northeastern course toward Springhill.  LA 157 joins LA 2 eastward out of Plain Dealing, narrowing again to two lanes, before turning south toward Rocky Mount.  LA 2 continues due east for  before intersecting LA 529 (Emma Cemetery Road).  Soon after this intersection, LA 2 crosses Bodcau Bayou into Webster Parish.

In Webster Parish, LA 2 enters Sarepta and intersects US 371, which heads north into Cullen and Springhill and south into Minden. After crossing this intersection, LA 2 immediately turns north onto South Main Street, running parallel to US 371 briefly before turning to the northeast. LA 2 is also signed from this point directly west to US 371, allowing drivers from either direction to bypass the short Main Street segment in favor of US 371. (This connector is officially LA 2 Spur). LA 2 then dips slightly to the south and crosses Bayou Dorcheat at a point known as Sykes Ferry. It then curves back to the northeast toward Shongaloo where it intersects LA 159. Here LA 2 Alternate begins and runs eastward through Haynesville, eventually meeting back up with LA 2 in Bernice. Meanwhile, LA 2 turns southward and runs concurrent with LA 159 to a point known as Leton. At an intersection with LA 160, which heads west to Cotton Valley, LA 159 continues southward to Minden while LA 2 turns to the southeast. Before crossing into Claiborne Parish, LA 2 intersects LA 521, which heads north to Millerton near the Arkansas state line.

After crossing the parish line, LA 2 intersects LA 534 Spur at a point known as Blackburn.  After , LA 2 intersects LA 534 itself, which heads north toward Haynesville and south toward Minden.  Curving due east, LA 2 intersects LA 3062 which splits off to the southeast into downtown Homer, the parish seat, while LA 2 slightly bypasses the town to the north.  Nearing the northwest corner of Homer, LA 2 intersects and begins a concurrency with US 79 Byp., a western bypass of the town that is also designated as the LA 9 truck route.  Just after this intersection, the three concurrent highways intersect LA 540, another route into Homer.  After crossing the Louisiana and North West (LNW) short-line railroad, the highways intersect US 79.  From this intersection, US 79 heads north to Haynesville and southwest through Homer to Minden; US 79 Byp. ends, having reached its parent route; and LA 2 and LA 9 Truck continue eastward out of Homer.

Homer to Bastrop
Just east of Homer, LA 2 intersects LA 9, ending the concurrency with LA 9 Truck.  LA 9 heads northeast through Summerfield to Junction City and south through Homer to points such as Athens and Arcadia.  LA 2 continues due east past the northern end of Lake Claiborne then intersects LA 806, which travels through a point known as Arizona.  After , LA 2 intersects LA 518 in Lisbon.  LA 518 provides a connection to Lake Claiborne State Park at Aycock to the south.  Before exiting Claiborne Parish, LA 2 intersects LA 152, which splits off to the southeast toward Dubach.

LA 2 crosses into Union Parish and continues east, entering Bernice on 8th Street.  It then intersects US 63/US 167, which runs northbound along Cherry Street toward Junction City and southbound along Plum Street toward Ruston.  LA 2 turns north for four blocks, running briefly concurrent with US 63/US 167, to 4th Street where it meets the eastern terminus of LA 2 Alt.  LA 2 then turns east, narrowing again to two lanes, and follows 4th Street out of Bernice.   outside the town limit, LA 2 intersects LA 550, after which it curves to the southeast through Shiloh.  LA 2 then continues in a general eastward direction for  before making the first of several crossings over parts of Bayou D'Arbonne Lake.  Shortly afterward, LA 2 enters the town of Farmerville, the parish seat.  Here it turns south onto North Main Street, running concurrent with LA 15.  One block later at Miller Street, LA 33 is added to the concurrency, having entered from the direction of Marion to the northeast.  After passing through the center of town, LA 2 turns east onto East Water Street, gaining a center turning lane, while LA 15/LA 33 continues southward across Bayou D'Arbonne Lake toward Monroe and Ruston, respectively.  At Holder Road, the center lane disappears, and LA 2 becomes an undivided two-lane highway again.

 east of the Farmerville city limits, LA 2 intersects LA 828 then turns to the southeast, intersecting LA 143 at a point known as Crossroads. LA 143 connects to Monroe on the south. LA 2 then curves back to the southeast and crosses the Ouachita River into the town of Sterlington in Ouachita Parish. In Sterlington, LA 2 intersects LA 553 which follows the Ouachita River southward. On the southeast end of town, LA 2 intersects US 165 north of Monroe. LA 2 turns north, running concurrent with the divided four-lane US 165, and crosses from Ouachita Parish into Morehouse Parish.

On the parish line, at a point known as Perryville, US 165 and LA 2 intersect LA 554, which heads east to Collinston. US 165/LA 2 then curves to the east and enters the city of Bastrop.

Bastrop to eastern terminus
US 165 and LA 2 enter Bastrop on Madison Avenue.  As they approach the center of town, eastbound traffic continues east on Madison while westbound traffic follows parallel Jefferson Avenue.  At the city's main junction, US 165 and LA 2 intersect US 425, LA 139, and LA 593 which travel northbound on Franklin Street and southbound on Washington Street.  At this junction of five highways, US 425 and LA 593 continue north toward the Arkansas state line; LA 139 begins and heads south into Monroe; LA 593 heads south into Collinston; and US 165 and LA 2 are joined by US 425 eastward out of town.  At an intersection with LA 830-5 (Elm Street), the median gives way to a center turning lane.  Several other minor state routes are encountered on the east side of Bastrop: LA 830-6 (McCreight Street), LA 830-4 (Cooper Lake Road), LA 3051 (Grabault Road), and LA 830-3 (Peach Orchard Road).  At the intersection with LA 3051, the highway narrows again to two lanes.

 past the intersection with LA 830-3, the three concurrent highways enter the village of Mer Rouge on Davenport Avenue, its main street. Beginning at 18th Street, a median divides the street's two lanes. Reaching the village's main junction, which lies on either side of the Union Pacific Railroad tracks, US 165 turns northward toward Bonita and into Arkansas; US 425 turns south toward points such as Oak Ridge and Rayville; LA 138 begins and heads south toward Collinston; and LA 2 continues on its own as an undivided two-lane highway.

After crossing the parish line, LA 2 turns to the northeast and intersects LA 585 at Goodwill.  After , LA 2 intersects LA 582 at Redwing.  LA 582 heads eastward through Forest.  Several more minor routes are encountered on the way into Oak Grove, the parish seat: LA 878, LA 597, LA 587, and LA 879.  LA 2 follows Main Street through Oak Grove, gaining a center turning lane, and intersects LA 17 (Constitution Avenue), which heads northward to Kilbourne and southward eventually to Delhi on I-20.  Continuing east from LA 17, the center turn lane disappears, and LA 2 returns to an undivided two-lane highway for the remainder of its route.  Just east of Oak Grove, LA 2 intersects LA 589, another route into Forest, then crosses Bayou Macon into East Carroll Parish.  LA 2 travels east for a final  before reaching its eastern terminus, US 65, at Highland, a point just north of Lake Providence.

Byway designation
Nearly the entire route of LA 2 west of Lisbon constitutes the main path of the Boom or Bust Byway in the state-designated system of tourist routes known as the Louisiana Scenic Byways.

History

Pre-1955 route numbering
In the original Louisiana Highway system in use between 1921 and 1955, the modern LA 2 made up parts of several routes, including State Route 202 from the western terminus at the Texas state line to the intersection with the modern LA 1 south of Vivian; State Route 8 to Vivian; State Route 109 to Plain Dealing; State Route 70 to Shongaloo; State Route 66 to Leton; State Route 490 to Homer; State Route 11 to Lisbon; State Route 489 to Bernice; State Route 11 again to Farmerville; State Route 815 to the intersection with the modern LA 143 west of Sterlington; and State Route 11 once again to the eastern terminus north of Lake Providence.

Alignment changes since 1955
LA 2 was created with the 1955 Louisiana Highway renumbering, and its route has seen two significant alignment changes—the bypassing of Homer and a re-routing through Webster Parish—and a series of other improvements.

LA 2 originally followed LA 3062 into downtown Homer.  Upon reaching the intersection with US 79 and LA 9 at the courthouse square, LA 2 continued east out of town co-signed with LA 9.  The current alignment bypassing Homer to the north was opened in 1964, eliminating the concurrency with LA 9 and creating LA 3062 along the remainder of the bypassed route.  The other major alignment change shifted much of the route through Webster Parish.  From the Bayou Dorcheat bridge at Sykes Ferry (the original western terminus of LA 2 Alt.), LA 2 turned southeast onto Fire Tower Road to LA 160.  It then followed current LA 160 and Leton Cutoff Road to Leton.  Here it turned south onto current LA 159 and east onto Pistol Thomas Road, rejoining the current alignment just west of Blackburn.  LA 2 assumed its current alignment between Sykes Ferry and Leton in the early 1970s following what was previously LA 2 Alt. to Shongaloo and co-signed with LA 159 to Leton.  The western terminus of LA 2 Alt. was then truncated to its current location at Shongaloo.

Other alignment changes have included the creation of a one-way pair through Bastrop around 1969 with Madison Avenue converted to carry westbound traffic only and Jefferson Avenue added to carry eastbound traffic; the slight relocation of the intersection with US 165 at Sterlington around 1982 (Waterside Drive northeast of Old Sterlington Road is a remnant of the original connection); the streamlining of the junction at Leton about the same time; the shift onto a new bridge over Bayou Dorcheat at Sykes Ferry around 1984; and the re-routing onto a parallel street through Plain Dealing (LA 2 originally followed Palmetto Street east of LA 3).  More minor alignment changes resulted from the smoothing of several curves along the route, mostly in Claiborne and Union parishes.  Remnants of the original route exist today as short sections of local roads such as Old Homer Road near Blackburn, Old Lisbon Road at LA 806, Rocky Springs Road at LA 518, and Ben Lowery Road east of Shiloh.

More recent alterations have included: a change of connector in Vivian, slightly shortening the route by following Camp Road instead of East Arkansas Avenue; the widening of US 63/US 167 to four lanes through Bernice, much of which is concurrent with LA 2, by converting Cherry Street to carry northbound traffic only and parallel Plum Street added to carry southbound traffic; and lastly, the construction of a high-level bridge over the Ouachita River slightly shifted the alignment at Sterlington.  The new bridge, opened in July 2009, replaced the original swing bridge completed in 1932 during the administration of Governor Huey P. Long.  The original bridge existed just to the south of the current span and has been demolished, but the approach roads still exist.  The approach on the Union Parish side is now a local road while that on the Ouachita Parish side is now an extension of LA 553 as the height of the new bridge prevents LA 2 and LA 553 to intersect at the original location.

Future
Construction is currently underway by the Louisiana Department of Transportation and Development (La DOTD) to extend I-49 north from Shreveport to the Arkansas state line parallel to US 71, a project scheduled for completion in 2016.  An interchange with LA 2 has been constructed east of Hosston and is set to open in Summer 2013 along with all but the southernmost portion of the project on the northwest side of Shreveport.

Major intersections

Special routes

Shongaloo–Bernice alternate route

Louisiana Highway 2 Alternate (LA 2 Alt.) runs  in an east–west direction from Shongaloo to Bernice, connecting to LA 2 at either end.  LA 2 Alt. parallels the route of LA 2 to the north, traveling through the town of Haynesville where it intersects US 79.

LA 2 Alt. is an anomaly in the current state highway system, being the only special state route designated in the 1955 renumbering and the only "Alternate" state route. Its route has seen only one major change, the relocation of its western terminus from Sykes Ferry to Shongaloo in the early 1970s.

Sarepta spur route

Louisiana Highway 2 Spur (LA 2 Spur) provides a direct connection between westbound LA 2 and northbound US 371 in Sarepta.

LA 2 Spur also allows LA 2 traffic from either direction to bypass the brief section of the route running along Main Street in favor of the parallel US 371. This is facilitated by the route being signed simply as LA 2 with directional markers at US 371 leading back to the actual LA 2.

LA 2 Spur was created around 1959 when LA 7 (now US 371), formerly concurrent with LA 2 along Main Street, was shifted onto a parallel alignment through Sarepta.

See also

Notes

References

External links

Maps / GIS Data Homepage, Louisiana Department of Transportation and Development
Boom or Bust Byway at Louisiana Scenic Byways

0002
Transportation in Caddo Parish, Louisiana
Transportation in Bossier Parish, Louisiana
Transportation in Webster Parish, Louisiana
Transportation in Claiborne Parish, Louisiana
Transportation in Union Parish, Louisiana
Transportation in Ouachita Parish, Louisiana
Transportation in Morehouse Parish, Louisiana
Transportation in West Carroll Parish, Louisiana
Transportation in East Carroll Parish, Louisiana